American soldier may refer to:

 A member of the United States Army
 "American Soldier" (song), by Toby Keith, 2003
 American Soldier (album), by Queensrÿche, 2009
 An American Soldier (opera), a 2014/2018 composition by Huang Ruo, libretto by David Henry Hwang
 The American Soldier, a 1970 West German film by Rainer Werner Fassbinder
 An American Soldier or The Recruiter, a 2008 American documentary film by Edet Belzberg